The 2008–09 A-League was the 32nd season of top-flight soccer in Australia, and the fourth season of the A-League competition since its establishment in 2004. Two new clubs, North Queensland Thunder and Gold Coast Galaxy had received tentative licences from the FFA but these were revoked for the 2008–09 season on 12 March 2008. Expansion plans are on hold until the 2009–10 season. Based on their 2007–08 performances, the Central Coast Mariners and the Newcastle Jets competed in the 2009 AFC Champions League for the first time.

Changes to the league included:
 The introduction of both a youth league and women's league aligned with A-League clubs.
 An increase in the salary cap to A$1.9 million.
 The addition of a Junior Marquee player. (A player under the age of 23 who has up to A$150,000 of his salary outside of the cap.
 Injury replacement players can only match the injured players' salary, or have any excess included within the total Salary Cap.

Clubs

Foreign players

The following do not fill a Visa position:
1Those players who were born and started their professional career abroad but have since gained Australian Residency (and New Zealand Residency, in the case of Wellington Phoenix);
2Australian residents (and New Zealand residents, in the case of Wellington Phoenix) who have chosen to represent another national team;
3Injury Replacement Players, or National Team Replacement Players;
4Guest Players (eligible to play a maximum of ten games)

Salary cap exemptions and captains

Pre-season Challenge Cup 

All A-League clubs played the pre-season cup competition held in July and August, and were drawn into two groups.  Group A consisted of Adelaide United, Melbourne Victory, Newcastle Jets and Perth Glory. Group B was Central Coast Mariners, Queensland Roar, Sydney FC and Wellington Phoenix.

The winner of each group, Melbourne Victory and Wellington Phoenix, met in Wellington on 6 August 2008 for the Pre-Season Cup Final. With the score at 0–0 after 90 minutes, the game went to penalties, Melbourne Victory eventually prevailing 8–7, thus becoming the first team in A-League history to claim all three available trophies, after winning the Premiership and Championship in the 2006–07 season.

Regular season 
The 2008–09 A-League season was played over 21 rounds, followed by a finals series.

League table

Results

Round 1

Round 2

Round 3

Round 4

Round 5

Round 6

Round 7

Round 8

Round 9

Round 10

Round 11

Round 12

Round 13

Round 14

Round 15

Round 16

Round 17

Round 18

Round 19

Round 20

Round 21

Finals series

Statistics

Leading scorers

Attendance 
These are the attendance records of each of the teams at the end of the home and away season. The table does not include finals series attendances.

* Adelaide United played a one-off match at the Adelaide Oval against Sydney FC in their Round 18 match. This is why Adelaide United's highest single attendance exceeds the capacity of Hindmarsh Stadium.

Top 10 Attendances

Awards 
 The Premiers' Plate was awarded to the Melbourne Victory, who finished on top of the ladder after the regular season.
 The Johnny Warren Medal was awarded to Shane Smeltz from the Wellington Phoenix.
 The Coach of the Year was awarded to Aurelio Vidmar of Adelaide United.
 The Reebok Golden Boot was awarded to Shane Smeltz of the Wellington Phoenix (12 goals - regular season).
 The Rising Star award was awarded to Scott Jamieson of Adelaide United.
 The Fair Play Award was awarded to the Queensland Roar.
 Goalkeeper of the Year was awarded to Eugene Galekovic of Adelaide United.
 Referee of the Year was awarded to Matthew Breeze.
 Foreign Player of the Year was awarded to Charlie Miller of the Queensland Roar.

See also 
Adelaide United season 2008-09
Central Coast Mariners season 2008-09
Melbourne Victory season 2008-09
Newcastle United Jets FC season 2008-09
Perth Glory season 2008-09
Queensland Roar season 2008-09
Sydney FC season 2008-09
Wellington Phoenix season 2008-09
2008 Australian football code crowds

Notes

References

External links 
A-League official website, including fixtures
Football Federation Australia
SBS The World Game A-League section
FOXSPORTS.com.au A-League section and Official A-League Fantasy competition

 
A-League Men seasons
Aus
1
1